Gloeosporium is a genus of fungi belonging to the family Dermateaceae.

The genus has cosmopolitan distribution.

Species

Species:

Gloeosporium acaciae 
Gloeosporium acanthophylli 
Gloeosporium aceris 
Gloeosporium cattleyae
Gloeosporium mirabilis, associated with Onoclea sensibilis and Angiopteris genus ferns
Gloeosporium phegopteridis, associated with Asclepias tuberosa, the butterfly weed, and several fern families

References

Dermateaceae
Dermateaceae genera
Taxa named by John Baptiste Henri Joseph Desmazières
Taxa named by Camille Montagne
Taxa described in 1849